Orthogonius fugax is a species of ground beetle in the subfamily Orthogoniinae. It was described by Maximilien Chaudoir in 1871.

References

fugax
Beetles described in 1871